Kick in the Door may refer to:

"Kick in the Door", a song by the Notorious B.I.G. from Life After Death
"Kick in the Door", a song by Skunkhour from The Go